Anna Adelaïde Abrahams, (1849 – 1930) was a Dutch still life painter.

Biography
Abrahams was born 16 June 1849 in Middelburg, Netherlands. Abrahams' instructors included Jan Frederik Schütz, Rudolphina Swanida Wildrik, Maria Vos, and Adriana Johanna Haanen. She moved to The Hague in 1877. There she attended the Royal Academy of Art.

Beginning in 1882 Abrahams showed her work in Levende Meesters (Living Masters) exhibitions throughout the Netherlands. She exhibited in Europe in Paris, Berlin, Düsseldorf and Brussels. She exhibited her work at the Palace of Fine Arts at the 1893 World's Columbian Exposition in Chicago, Illinois.

Abrahams was a member of the art association Ons Doel Is Schoonheid (Our Goal Is Beauty) and was on the board of the Pulchri Studio. She never married.

Abrahams died 18 January 1930 in The Hague.

Gallery

Legacy
Abrahams works are in the Stedelijk Museum Amsterdam, The Mesdag Collection The Hague, the Gemeentemuseum Den Haag, the Zeeuws Museum in Middelburg, and the Kröller-Müller Museum in Otterlo.

References

External links
 

1849 births
1930 deaths
Dutch women painters
19th-century Dutch women artists
19th-century Dutch painters
Painters from Middelburg
Royal Academy of Art, The Hague alumni
20th-century Dutch women artists
20th-century Dutch painters